= Kumanovo Bus Station =

Bus station in Kumanovo, North Macedonia

Kumanovo Bus Station Автобуска станица Куманово

General information
- Location: Done Bozinov bb, Kumanovo; North Macedonia
- Platforms: 20 bus bays

Other information
- Website: www.sas.com.mk

Kumanovo Bus Station (Автобука Станица Куманово) is the main Bus station in Kumanovo, North Macedonia. It was operated by Jug-Turist company mow by Rule Turs company.

== Construction ==
The Station was partly renovated in 2014.

== See also ==
Kumanovo
